Emory University School of Law is the law school of Emory University and is part of the University's main campus in Druid Hills, Atlanta, Georgia.  It was founded in 1916 and was the first law school in Georgia to be granted membership in the American Association of Law Schools.

Campus

Emory Law is located in Gambrell Hall, part of Emory’s  campus in the Druid Hills neighborhood, six miles (10 km) northeast of downtown Atlanta. 
Gambrell Hall

Gambrell Hall contains classrooms, faculty offices, administrative offices, student-organization offices, and a 325-seat auditorium.  The school provides wireless Internet access throughout its facilities. Gambrell Hall also houses a courtroom.

Hugh F. MacMillan Library

Emory's five-story Hugh F. MacMillan Law Library opened in August 1995.  The library is situated adjacent to Gambrell Hall and includes access to over 400,000 volumes and more than 4,000 serials subscriptions.

Admissions and academics

Admission to the law school is selective. For the class entering in the fall of 2017, 238 JD candidates enrolled from an applicant pool of 4,117. The 25th and 75th LSAT percentiles for the Class of 2025 were 161 and 169, respectively, with a median of 168. The 25th and 75th undergraduate GPA percentiles were 3.43 and 3.90, respectively, with a median of 3.80.

Nearly half of Emory Law students are women, and about 32% are from underrepresented ethnic groups. Approximately 60% of students come from outside the Southeastern U.S.

It is ranked #30 among ABA-approved law schools in the 2023 rankings by U.S. News & World Report.

Doctor of Law Degree

The School of Law offers a three-year, full-time program leading to a Juris Doctor degree.  Emory Law is particularly known for its expertise in Bankruptcy Law, Environmental Law, Feminist Legal Theory, Intellectual Property Law, International law, Law and Religion, and Transactional Law.

Joint-Degree Programs

Emory Law also offers joint-degree programs through cooperation with the Goizueta Business School (JD/MBA and JM/MBA), the Candler School of Theology (JD/MTS and JD/M.Div.), the Graduate School of Arts and Sciences (JD/Ph.D.), the Rollins School of Public Health (JD/MPH), the Emory Center for Ethics (JD/MA in Bioethics), and joint JD and Master of Laws degree (JD/LLM) through Emory University School of Law.

LLM Programs

In partnership with Central European University, Emory also provides an LLM program for students with a U.S. law degree seeking advanced training in international commercial law and international politics. Emory also has a separate LLM program for qualified foreign professionals seeking training in international and comparative law.

Juris Master Program

Emory Law's Juris Master is a 30-credit hour program that is intended to supplement a student's interest or professional experience in allied fields to law. The program offers a range of customized concentrations to allow students to enhance their skills in their home profession or interest area through a greater understanding of the law, legal concepts and frameworks. The coursework can be completed either full-time in nine months or part-time in up to four years.

Clinics and programs

Students' expertise is developed through several clinics and programs.  Emory Law also offers several summer study abroad programs in Budapest at the Central European University (CEU) and throughout the world.

Academic programs

A team from Emory Law's TI:GER IP/patent/technology program, a collaborative program between Emory and Georgia Tech, was featured on CNN Money.
Other academic programs at Emory Law include:
 Environmental and Natural Resources Law Program
 Externship Program
 Transactional Law Certificate Program
 Kessler-Eidson Program for Trial Techniques
 Emory Law School Supreme Court Advocacy Program

Centers
 Barton Child Advocacy Center
 Center for Advocacy and Dispute Resolution
 Center on Federalism and Intersystemic Governance
 Center for International and Comparative Law
Center for the Study of Law and Religion
 Center for Transactional Law and Practice
 Feminism and Legal Theory Project
 Global Health Law and Policy Project
 Project on War and Security in Law, Culture, and Society
 Vulnerability and the Human Condition Initiative

Clinics
 Barton Policy and Legislative Clinics
 Barton Appeal for Youth Clinic
 Barton Juvenile Defender Clinic
 International Humanitarian Law Clinic
 Turner Environmental Law Clinic
 Volunteer Clinic for Veterans

Externships

The law school has a comprehensive externship program. Students have the opportunity to experience what it's like to work in a public defender or prosecutor's office, government agency, nonprofit organization, judge's chambers, or in-house counsel's office in the Atlanta metro area.

Publications
 Emory Law Journal, which hosts the annual Randolph W. Thrower Symposium.
 Emory Bankruptcy Developments Journal, the only national bankruptcy journal edited and produced entirely by law students, which hosts an annual symposium and banquet.
 Emory Corporate Governance and Accountability Review, a law journal focusing on corporate law and compliance issues. 
 Emory International Law Review, which publishes articles on topics ranging from human rights to international intellectual property issues.
 IP Theory (online only, published jointly with Indiana University Maurer School of Law)
 Journal of Law and Religion, a peer-reviewed, interdisciplinary journal edited by the Center for the Study of Law and Religion, with student participation, and published in collaboration with Cambridge University Press
 Emory Law journal articles are accessible online through its Open Access institutional repository, Emory Law Scholarly Commons

Employment 
According to Emory's official 2017 ABA-required disclosures, 71.5% of the Class of 2017 obtained full-time, long-term, JD-required, non-school funded employment nine months after graduation. Emory's Law School Transparency under-employment score is 13.2%, indicating the percentage of the Class of 2017 unemployed, pursuing an additional degree, or working in a non-professional, short-term, or part-time job nine months after graduation, and an additional 3.7% were in school funded positions.

Costs
The total cost of attendance (indicating the cost of tuition, fees, and living expenses) at Emory for the 2013–2014 academic year is $75,716. The Law School Transparency estimated debt-financed cost of attendance for three years is $290,430.

Notable alumni

Business and private practice 
John Chidsey, current CEO of Subway (restaurant), former Executive Chairman and CEO of the Burger King Corporation
John Dowd, President Trump's personal attorney (and leader of his legal team);  investigator and author of the Dowd Report, which detailed betting on baseball games by Pete Rose in the 1980s; represented Senator John McCain (R-AZ) during the Senate ethics investigation known as the Keating Five in the hearings held in 1990 and 1991
C. Robert Henrikson, former chairman, president, and CEO of MetLife
Boisfeuillet Jones, Sr., Atlanta philanthropist
Jim Lanzone, President and CEO of CBS Interactive; Chief Digital Officer of CBS Corporation
Raymond W. McDaniel Jr., president and chief executive officer of Moody's Corporation

Government and politics 
David I. Adelman, former United States Ambassador to Singapore
Luis A. Aguilar, commissioner at the U.S. Securities and Exchange Commission (LL.M.; J.D. University of Georgia School of Law)
Thurbert Baker, Attorney General of Georgia, 1997–2011
Sanford Bishop, current U.S. Representative for Georgia's 2nd congressional district
Benjamin B. Blackburn, former U.S. Representative for Georgia's 4th congressional district
James V. Carmichael, former member of the Georgia General Assembly, former president of Scripto pen company, candidate for governor of Georgia in 1946
John James Flynt, Jr., former U.S. Representative from Georgia (attended but did not graduate)
Tillie K. Fowler, former U.S. Representative for the 4th District of Florida
Wyche Fowler, former President of the Atlanta City Council, former United States Congressman 5th Congressional District of Georgia, former United States Senator Georgia, former United States Ambassador to Saudi Arabia
Gordon Giffin, former United States Ambassador to Canada
Carte Goodwin, former United States Senator of West Virginia
Ben F. Johnson, former member of the Georgia State Senate and Dean of the Emory University School of Law and the Georgia State University College of Law
Robb LaKritz, former Advisor to the Deputy U.S. Treasury Secretary, appointed by President George W. Bush
Elliott H. Levitas, former U.S. Representative from Georgia
Christian Miele, member of the Maryland House of Delegates
Joe Negron, elected to replace Mark Foley as the Republican candidate in the 16th District of Florida in the 2006 election
Sam Nunn, former United States Senator from Georgia 1972–1997; businessman
Sam Olens, Attorney General of Georgia, 2011–2016; formerly president of Kennesaw State University
Randolph W. Thrower, former U.S. Commissioner of Internal Revenue
Teresa Tomlinson, 69th Mayor of Columbus, Georgia, 2011-2019
Fani Willis, first female District Attorney of Fulton County, Georgia

Judiciary 
Anthony Alaimo, Judge of the United States District Court for the Southern District of Georgia
Marvin S. Arrington, Sr., former Fulton County Superior Court judge and author of Making My Mark: The Story of a Man Who Wouldn’t Stay in His Place, GA's 45th "Book of the Year"
Rowland Barnes, former Fulton County Superior Court judge murdered in his courtroom
Stanley F. Birch, Jr., Judge of the United States Court of Appeals for the Eleventh Circuit
Elizabeth L. Branch, Judge on the United States Court of Appeals for the Eleventh Circuit
Fred P. Branson, Associate Justice of the Oklahoma Supreme Court, served as Chief Justice 1927–1929
Ada E. Brown, Judge of the United States District Court for the Northern District of Texas, former appellate justice on the Fifth Court of Appeals of Texas
Mark Howard Cohen, judge on the United States District Court for the Northern District of Georgia
Clarence Cooper, Judge of the United States District Court for the Northern District of Georgia
Kristi DuBose, Chief Judge of the United States District Court for the Southern District of Alabama
J. Robert Elliott, Judge of the United States District Court for the Middle District of Georgia
Orinda D. Evans, former chief district judge of the United States District Court for the Northern District of Georgia
J. Owen Forrester, Judge of the United States District Court for the Northern District of Georgia
Richard Cameron Freeman, Judge of the United States District Court for the Northern District of Georgia
Leo M. Gordon, Judge of the United States Court of International Trade
Steven Grimberg, Judge of the United States District Court for the North District of Georgia
Catharina Haynes, Judge on the United States Court of Appeals for the Fifth Circuit
Lynn Carlton Higby, Judge of the United States District Court for the Northern District of Florida
James Clinkscales Hill, Judge of the United States Court of Appeals for the Fifth Circuit and the United States Court of Appeals for the Eleventh Circuit
Frank M. Hull, Judge on the United States Court of Appeals for the Eleventh Circuit
Willis B. Hunt Jr., Judge of the United States District Court for the Northern District of Georgia
Hugh Lawson, Judge of the United States District Court for the Middle District of Georgia
Charles Allen Moye Jr., Judge of the United States District Court for the Northern District of Georgia
R. Kenton Musgrave, Judge of the United States Court of International Trade
William Clark O'Kelley, Judge of the United States District Court for the Northern District of Georgia
John Andrew Ross, Judge of the United States District Court for the Eastern District of Missouri
Leah Ward Sears, former Chief Justice of the Supreme Court of Georgia
George Ernest Tidwell, Judge of the United States District Court for the Northern District of Georgia
Robert H. Whaley, Judge of the United States District Court for the Eastern District of Washington

Other 
W. Watts Biggers, co-creator of the animated TV series Underdog
Glenda Hatchett, former Chief Judge of Fulton County Juvenile Court, and star of the television show Judge Hatchett
Bobby Jones, former amateur golfer, founder and designer of the Augusta National Golf Club
Bernice King, minister, daughter of Coretta and Martin Luther King Jr.
Larry Klayman, founder and former Chairman of Judicial Watch
Josh Luber, co-founder of luxury resale website StockX
Robert Shemin, real estate investor and author
Bob Varsha, on-air personality for Speed

Notable faculty

Abdullahi Ahmed An-Na'im
Frank S. Alexander
 Dorothy A. Brown
Michael Broyde
Kathleen Cleaver
Martha Albertson Fineman
Richard D. Freer
Michael J. Perry
Charles A. Shanor
Johan D. van der Vyver
John Witte Jr.

References

External links
 Official Site

 

Law
Educational institutions established in 1916
Law schools in Georgia (U.S. state)
1916 establishments in Georgia (U.S. state)